Metamorphic core complexes are exposures of deep crust exhumed in association with largely amagmatic extension.  They form, and are exhumed, through relatively fast transport of middle and lower continental crust to the Earth's surface. During this process, high-grade  metamorphic rocks (eclogite-, granulite- to amphibolite- facies) are exposed below  low-angle detachment faults (and mylonitic shear zones) that show ductile deformation on the lower side  (footwall) with amphibolite- to greenschist-facies  syndeformational metamorphism, and  ductile-brittle to brittle deformation on the upper-side (hanging-wall) with tilted geometries.

Descriptions
  stated that they: 
are characterized by a generally heterogeneous, older metamorphic-plutonic basement terrane overprinted by low-dipping lineated and foliated mylonitic and gneissic fabrics.  An unmetamorphosed cover terrane is typically attenuated and sliced by numerous subhorizontal younger-on-older faults.  Between the basement and cover terranes is a decollement and/or steep metamorphic gradient with much brecciation and kinematic structural relationships indicating sliding or detachment.

The decollement is also called a detachment fault. 

 : 
Metamorphic core complexes form as the result of major continental extension, when the middle and lower continental crust is dragged out from beneath the fracturing, extending upper crust. Movement zones capable of producing such effects evolve in space as well as with time. Deforming rocks in the footwall are uplifted through a progression of different metamorphic and deformational environments, producing a characteristic sequence of (overprinted) meso- and microstructures.

Location
The core complex model was first developed in the cordillera of western North America, with older cores found in the north (Eocene), and younger to the south. Globally, core complexes are thought to be found in the Aegean Sea , Anatolia, Iran, Tibet, north China, Slovakia , Venezuela-Trinidad (Miocene), New Zealand and West Antarctica .  The youngest core complex is found in eastern New Guinea.

Core complexes on other planets
A feature at the center of Artemis Corona on Venus has been suggested as a metamorphic core complex .  This could be the largest metamorphic core complex in the solar system.

See also
 Northern Snake Range metamorphic core complex
 Oceanic core complex

References

External links
Metamorphic core complexes
Cordilleran metamorphic core complexes: Cenozoic extensional relics of Mesozoic compression  Peter J. Coney. Tekla A. Harms. Geology, September, 1984

Tectonics
Metamorphic petrology
Metamorphic complexes